Driss Khalid (born 7 February 1999) is a professional footballer who plays as a forward for Championnat National 2 club Chambly. Born in France, he represented Morocco at youth international level.

Club career
Khalid joined the Toulouse training centre in 2011, and signed his first professional contract with the club in 2017. He made his professional debut for Toulouse in a 2–0 Ligue 1 loss to Marseille on 24 September 2017.

In May 2019 he signed a three-year deal with Amiens. After spending a season with the development squad, he made his debut for Amiens on 22 August 2020, in the 1–0 Ligue 2 victory over Nancy, during which he was sent-off after only a few minutes on the pitch.

On 16 November 2020, Khalid joined Championnat National side Orléans on loan until the end of the 2020–21 season.

International career
Khalid was born in France to Moroccan parents. He represented the Morocco U17s at the 2015 Montaigu Tournament.

At the age of 16, Khalid also represented the Morocco U20s at the L'Alcúdia International Football Tournament in 2015, scoring three goals in his first three games. He also assisted the winner in a 3–2 friendly win over the France U20s in a friendly match on 6 September 2017.

References

External links

1999 births
Living people
Footballers from Toulouse
Association football forwards
Moroccan footballers
Morocco youth international footballers
French footballers
French sportspeople of Moroccan descent
Toulouse FC players
Amiens SC players
US Orléans players
Moulins Yzeure Foot players
FC Chambly Oise players
Ligue 1 players
Ligue 2 players
Championnat National players
Championnat National 2 players
Championnat National 3 players